This is a list of notable restaurants in Lagos, Nigeria.

Restaurants in Lagos

 Bogobiri House
 Club Quilox
 Hard Rock Cafe
 Tastee Fried Chicken
 Terra Kulture
 Veggie Victory
 Yellow Chilli Restaurant

See also

List of restaurants
Companies based in Lagos (category)

References

Lagos-related lists
 
Lagos